Robert Hoe Jr. [V] (January 15, 1922February 16, 1983) was an American entrepreneur, philanthropist, and band enthusiast.

Early life
Hoe was born on January 15, 1922, the descendant of presidents of R. Hoe & Company. He attended Pomona College, graduating in 1943.

Career
Hoe was the president of an architectural woodworking firm for more than two decades. He subsequently owned a chain of bowling alleys.

Musical activities
Hoe amassed one of the most extensive collections of band scores ever compiled.

References

1922 births
1983 deaths
American collectors
American businesspeople
Pomona College alumni